Good Man Down is the second album by Estonian indie rock band Ewert and The Two Dragons. It was released on April 15, 2011, as the follow-up to their debut album The Hills Behind The Hills. Upon release, the album was met with positive response from critics and was nominated for four awards for Estonian Music Awards, of which it won all. The album was the best-selling album of 2011 and 2012 in Estonia. On June 25, 2013, the album was re-released in the US by Sire Records and Warner Bros. Records.

Summary
The band started recording the album as a follow-up to their 2009 album The Hills Behind The Hills. The songs were written and developed during the band's stay at a cottage in Kloogaranna which belonged to Ewert Sundja's father-in-law. The tracks "(In The End) There's Only Love" and "You Had Me At Hello" were recorded during the band's stay at Kloogaranna. The recording of the rest of the album took place in Türi Centre for Performing Arts at the end of 2010 and beginning of 2011. Additional recording and mastering of the album took place at Sonicmedia Studios by Siim Mäesalu.

On April 15, the album was released in Estonia and Latvia on the Latvian indie label I Love You Records. A year after that, the album was released in Belgium and the Netherlands on Talitres Records. On November 9, the album came out in Sweden under the label Adore Music.

The first single from the album, "(In The End) There's Only Love" was released in January 2011 for radio airplay in Estonia and Latvia. It was immediately picked up by Estonian and Latvian radio stations and was well received by listeners and critics. The music video for the song was released on January 19.
The second single from the album, "Good Man Down" was released in November. On November 8, a music video for the single was released, directed by Andzei Matsukevits and Kaimar Kukk and produced by Contrast Eye and Caviar Productions.

Track listing

Awards and nominations

Estonian Music Awards

|-
|rowspan="3"|2011
|rowspan="2"| "Good Man Down"
|Album of The Year
|
|-
|Best Rock Album
|
|-
|rowspan="1"| Good Man Down
|Song of The Year
|
|}

Radio 2 Hit of The Year

|-
|rowspan="1"|2011
|rowspan="1"| "Good Man Down"
|Hit of The Year
|
|}

European Border Breakers Award

|-
||2012
|| Good Man Down
|EBBA
|
|}

Personnel 
Ewert and The Two Dragons
 Ewert Sundja
 Erki Pärnoja
 Kristjan Kallas
 Ivo Etti

Additional personnel
Siim Mäesalu - mastering, engineering
Bruno Roze - artwork
Johanna Eenma - photography
Rasmus Jurkatam - photography

References 

2011 albums
Ewert and The Two Dragons albums
European Border Breakers Award-winning albums